William Rankine Milligan, Lord Milligan,  (12 December 1898 – 28 July 1975) was a Scottish judge and Unionist politician. He served as Solicitor General for Scotland and Lord Advocate.

Early life
Milligan was educated at Sherborne School, University College, Oxford, and the University of Glasgow. In the First World War, Milligan served with the Highland Light Infantry from 1917 to 1919.

Legal career
Milligan was admitted as an advocate in 1925, and appointed a King's Counsel in 1945. He was appointed Solicitor General for Scotland from 1951 to 1954, and Lord Advocate from 1955
to 1960, and was made a Privy Counsellor in 1955. He was appointed to the College of Justice in 1960, with the judicial title Lord Milligan.

Politics
Milligan was an unsuccessful parliamentary candidate at Glasgow St Rollox in 1945 and again at Central Ayrshire in 1950 and 1951, and was elected for Edinburgh North in a 1955 by-election,
where he served until 1960.

Family 
His son James Milligan, Lord Milligan was a Senator of the College of Justice.

References

External links 
 

1898 births
1975 deaths
People educated at Sherborne School
Alumni of University College, Oxford
Solicitors General for Scotland
Milligan
Highland Light Infantry officers
British Army personnel of World War I
Members of the Parliament of the United Kingdom for Edinburgh constituencies
Unionist Party (Scotland) MPs
Members of the Privy Council of the United Kingdom
UK MPs 1955–1959
UK MPs 1959–1964
Members of the Royal Company of Archers
Lord Advocates
Scottish King's Counsel
20th-century King's Counsel
Ministers in the third Churchill government, 1951–1955
Ministers in the Eden government, 1955–1957
Ministers in the Macmillan and Douglas-Home governments, 1957–1964